Scotogramma fieldi is a species of cutworm or dart moth in the family Noctuidae first described by William Barnes and Foster Hendrickson Benjamin in 1927. It is found in North America.

The MONA or Hodges number for Scotogramma fieldi is 10250.

References

Further reading

 
 
 

Hadenini
Articles created by Qbugbot
Moths described in 1927